The following are operators of the Gloster Gladiator.

Operators

Australia
Royal Australian Air Force
 No. 3 Squadron RAAF

Belgium
Belgium received 16 Mk I aircraft (G15-G30) and an additional eight were built at SABCA (G31-G38)
According to other sources 22 aircraft were ordered, 15 of which were delivered carrying the serials G5-1 to G5-15, the remaining seven were assembled by SABCA. The 'G' serials mentioned by Spencer (but then only the range G-17 to G-38) would have been applied later, while in service.
Belgian Army Aviation
 1st Escadrille de Chasse 'La Comète'

China
China received 36 Mk I aircraft in January 1938, given the Chinese serial numbers 5701-5736. They served until December 1939, when the last aircraft was shot down.
Chinese Nationalist Air Force
 No. 28 Pursuit Squadron
 No. 29 Pursuit Squadron
 No. 32 Pursuit Squadron

Egypt
Egypt received over 40 Mk II aircraft.
Royal Egyptian Air Force
 No. 2 Squadron
 No. 5 Squadron

Finland

Finland received 30 Mk.IIs from the UK during the Winter War, plus an additional 12 Mk.Is from Sweden after the Winter War.
Finnish Air Force
 F.19 The Swedish Volunteer Unit Flygflottilj 19
 LeLv 12
 LeLv 14
 LeLv 16
 LeLv 26

Free France
Free French Air Force
 Free French Flight 'Alsace'

Germany
The Third Reich captured at least 15 airworthy Mk Is.
Luftwaffe

Greece
Greece received 19 Mk I and 6 Mk II aircraft. The first two Mk I aircraft were bought by M. Zarparkis Hoimogenos (for £9,200) for presentation to the Royal Hellenic Air Force in 1938. They carried the serial numbers  Delta Epsilon 1 and 2. The later 17 obtained Mk I aircraft retained their RAF serials, as did the six Mk IIs. Most of them were eventually destroyed by enemy air attack at Paramytia or at Amphiklia the next day.
Hellenic Royal Air Force
 No. 21 Mira

Iraq
Iraq received 24 Mk I and 5 Mk II aircraft. The initial 15 purchased Mk I aircraft bore the Iraqi serial numbers 80 to 94. Two of the Mk II aircraft were still in use in 1949 at Mosul, the last finally withdrawn in 1951.
Royal Iraqi Air Force
 No. 4 Squadron RoIAF

Ireland
Ireland received 4 Mk I aircraft. The aircraft received the Irish serial numbers 23 to 26. The last surviving aircraft was 24, which crashed in January 1944, while 26 spent most of its life in the repair shop after a landing accident.
Irish Air Corps
 No. 1 Army Co-operation Squadron

Latvia
Latvia received 26 Mk I aircraft.
Latvian Air Force
 123 Eskadrile Armijas Aviacija sporting the numbers 114 to 126.
 124 Eskadrile Armijas Aviacija sporting the numbers 163 to 175.

Lithuania
Lithuania received 14 Mk I aircraft, bearing the serial numbers G-704 to G-717.  Twelve of them fell in Russian hands when Russia invaded Lithuania in June 1940, at least one of them later fell in German hands when Germany invaded the by then former Lithuania in June 1941.
Lithuanian Air Force
 No. 5 Eskadra Karo Aviacija

Norway

Norway received six Mk I and six Mk II aircraft from the UK in 1938-39.
Royal Norwegian Air Force
 Jagevingen of  the Norwegian Army Air Service

Portugal
Portugal received 15 Mark I and 15 Mk II aircraft for its Arma da Aeronáutica Militar (Army Military Aviation), the aircraft delivered in two batches of 15.  They received the Portuguese serial numbers 450-464 and 465-479 respectively.  The Gladiators served until 1953 with the Força Aérea Portuguesa (Portuguese Air Force) as it was by then called.
Portuguese Air Force
 Esquadrilha Expedicionária de Caça nº1 (Expeditionary Fighter Squadron No. 1), based at Rabo de Peixe.
 Esquadrilha Expedicionária de Caça nº2 (Expeditionary Fighter Squadron No. 2 of Azores), first based at Achada and later at Lajes.
 Esquadrilha de Caça (Fighter Squadron), based at Ota.

South Africa
South Africa received 12 Mk II and 11 Mk I ex-RAF aircraft.
South African Air Force
 No. 1 Squadron SAAF
 No. 2 Squadron SAAF
 No. 3 Squadron SAAF

Soviet Union
The Soviet Union captured 32 Latvian and Lithuanian Mk. Is aircraft.
Soviet Air Force

Sweden
Sweden received 37 Mk I (designated J-8) and 18 Mk II (designated J8A) aircraft.
The 37 Mk Is were built new from 1927-1938 and were fitted with NOHAB built Bristol Mercury VIS2 engines. The 12 Mk IIs were built new in 1938 and were fitted with NOHAB built Bristol Mercury VIIIS.3 engines. The Gladiators were in action from January 1940 against Russian attacks on Finland and some were fitted with ski landing gear and underwing bomb-racks for eight lightweight bombs.
Swedish Air Force
 Flygflottilj 8
 Flygflottilj 10
 Flygflottilj 19

United Kingdom

Royal Air Force
 No. 1 Squadron RAF
 No. 3 Squadron RAF
 No. 6 Squadron RAF
 No. 14 Squadron RAF
 No. 25 Squadron RAF
 No. 33 Squadron RAF
 No. 46 Squadron RAF
 No. 54 Squadron RAF
 No. 56 Squadron RAF
 No. 65 Squadron RAF
 No. 72 Squadron RAF
 No. 73 Squadron RAF
 No. 74 Squadron RAF
 No. 80 Squadron RAF
 No. 85 Squadron RAF
 No. 87 Squadron RAF
 No. 94 Squadron RAF
 No. 112 Squadron RAF
 No. 117 Squadron RAF
 No. 123 Squadron RAF
 No. 127 Squadron RAF
 No. 141 Squadron RAF
 No. 152 Squadron RAF
 No. 237 "Rhodesia" Squadron RAF
 No. 239 Squadron RAF
 No. 247 Squadron RAF
 No. 261 Squadron RAF
 No. 263 Squadron RAF
 No. 267 Squadron RAF
 No. 274 Squadron RAF
 No. 520 Squadron RAF
 No. 521 Squadron RAF
 No. 602 Squadron RAF
 No. 603 Squadron RAF
 No. 604 Squadron RAF
 No. 605 Squadron RAF
 No. 607 Squadron RAF
 No. 615 Squadron RAF

 No. 401 (Meteorological) Flight RAF
 No. 1401 (Meteorological) Flight RAF
 No. 402 (Meteorological) Flight RAF
 No. 1402 (Meteorological) Flight RAF
 No. 1403 (Meteorological) Flight RAF
 No. 1411 (Meteorological) Flight RAF
 No. 1412 (Meteorological) Flight RAF
 No. 1413 (Meteorological) Flight RAF
 No. 1414 (Meteorological) Flight RAF
 No. 1415 (Meteorological) Flight RAF
 No. 1560 (Meteorological) Flight RAF
 No. 1561 (Meteorological) Flight RAF
 No. 1562 (Meteorological) Flight RAF
 No. 1563 (Meteorological) Flight RAF
 No. 1565 (Meteorological) Flight RAF
 No. 1622 (Anti-Aircraft Co-operation) Flight RAF
 No. 1624 (Anti-Aircraft Co-operation) Flight RAF
 No. 1 School of Army Co-operation RAF
 No. 2 Flying Training School RAF (FTS)
 No. 3 Flying Training School RAF (FTS)
 No. 4 Flying Training School RAF (FTS)
 No. 5 Flying Training School RAF (FTS)
 No. 6 Flying Training School RAF (FTS)
 No. 7 Flying Training School RAF (FTS)
 No. 9 Flying Training School RAF (FTS)
 No. 10 Flying Training School RAF (FTS)
 No. 5 Operational Training Unit RAF (OTU)
 No. 6 Operational Training Unit RAF (OTU)
 No. 8 Operational Training Unit RAF (OTU)
 No. 41 Operational Training Unit RAF (OTU)
 No. 60 Operational Training Unit RAF (OTU)
 No. 61 Operational Training Unit RAF (OTU)

Fleet Air Arm
 759 Naval Air Squadron
 760 Naval Air Squadron
 767 Naval Air Squadron
 769 Naval Air Squadron
 770 Naval Air Squadron
 771 Naval Air Squadron
 774 Naval Air Squadron
 775 Naval Air Squadron
 776 Naval Air Squadron
 778 Naval Air Squadron
 787 Naval Air Squadron
 791 Naval Air Squadron
 792 Naval Air Squadron
 797 Naval Air Squadron
 800 Naval Air Squadron
 801 Naval Air Squadron
 802 Naval Air Squadron
 804 Naval Air Squadron
 805 Naval Air Squadron
 806 Naval Air Squadron
 813 Naval Air Squadron
 880 Naval Air Squadron
 885 Naval Air Squadron

See also
Gloster Gladiator

References

Notes

Bibliography

Belcarz, Bartłomiej and Pęczkowski, Robert. Gloster Gladiator, Monografie Lotnicze 24 (in Polish). Gdańsk, Poland: AJ-Press, 1996. .
Bierman, John and Smith, Colin. The Battle of Alamein: Turning Point, World War II. New York: Viking, 2002. .
Brown, Robin. Shark Squadron: The History of 112 Squadron, 1917-1975. Manchester, UK: Crecy Publishing, 1997. .
Chairulin, M. "Kryla Litvy" AC 1/1990.
Crawford, Alex. Gloster Gladiator. Redbourn, UK: Mushroom Model Publications, 2002. .
Fodor, Denis J. The Neutrals (Time-Life World War II Series). Des Moines, Iowa: Time-Life Books, 1982. .
Green, William and Swanborough, Gordon. WW2 Aircraft Fact Files: RAF Fighters, Part 1. London, UK: Macdonald and Jane's, 1978. .
Harrison, W.A. Gloster Gladiator in Action. Carrollton, Texas: Squadron Signal, 2003. .
Irbitis, K. "Latvijas Gaisaspeki" Flieger Revue.
 James, Derek N. Gloster Aircraft since 1917. London:Putnam, 1971. .
Jan, A. H. "Das Irish Air Corps" Flieger Revue.
Lewis, Peter. Squadron Histories: R.F.C, R.N.A.S and R.A.F. 1912-59. London:Putnam, 1959.
Lyman, Robert. Iraq 1941: The battles for Basra, Habbniya, Fallujah and Baghdad. Oxford, UK: Osprey Publishing, 2006. .
Mason, Francis K. British Fighters of World War Two, Volume One. Windsor, Berkshire, UK: Hilton Lacy Publishers Ltd., 1969. .
Mason, Francis K. The British Fighter since 1912. Annapolis, USA:Naval Institute Press, 1992. .
Mason, Francis K. The Gloster Gladiator. London: Macdonald, 1964.
Mason, Francis K. The Gloster Gladiator. Leatherhead, UK: Profile Publications, 1966.
Pejčoch, Ivo. Bojové Legendy: Gloster Gladiator (in Czech). Prague, Czech Republic: Jan Vašut s.r.o., 2008. .
Poolman, Kenneth. Faith, Hope and Charity: Three Biplanes Against an Air Force. London, UK: William Kimber and Co. Ltd., 1954. (1st pocket edition in 1958)
Rawlings, John D.R. Fighter Squadrons of the RAF and Their Aircraft.  London, UK: Macdonald and Jane's, 1969. 2nd edition 1976. .
Spencer, Tom. Gloster Gladiator, Warpaint Series No.37. Luton, UK: Warpaint Books, 2003. .
Thetford, Owen. "On Silver Wings" Part 20. Aeroplane Monthly, May 1992, Vol 20 No 5, Issue 229. London:IPC. . pp. 8–15.
Thomas, Andrew. Gloster Gladiator Aces. Botley, UK: Osprey Publishing, 2002. .
Vistakas, C. "The Annals of Lithuanian Aviation" Air Enthusiast 29.

Zbiegniewski, Andre R. 112 Sqn "Shark Squadron", 1939-1941 (bi-lingual Polish/English text). Lublin, Poland: Oficyna Wydawnicza Kagero, 2003. .

Lists of military units and formations by aircraft
Gladiator